Shareh or Sharah may refer to:
 Shareh, Khuzestan (شره)
 Shareh, Mazandaran (شاره - Shāreh)
 Shareh, Razavi Khorasan (شاره - Shāreh)